This is a list of companies based in Redmond, Washington, United States. Although Redmond is a metonym for Microsoft, the city's largest employer, it has many other businesses as well.

Based in Redmond
 Amazon.com
Amazon Kuiper
 AT&T Wireless
 Data I/O
 Edmark
 HipSoft
 Hyperlite
Innersloth
 Mac & Jack's Brewing Company
 Microsoft
343 Industries game studio
 Good Science Studio game studio
 Launchworks game studio
 Microsoft Studios game studio
 Turn 10 Studios
Mojang
 Paizo Publishing
 Solstice
 Samsung Semiconductor
 WildTangent

Major operation in Redmond
 AT&T Mobility (formerly Cingular, headquartered in Redmond)
 Genie (subsidiary of Terex since 2002, formerly Genie Industries headquartered in Redmond)
 Hyperloop Genesis
 Nintendo of America (subsidiary of Nintendo)
 Physio-Control (subsidiary of Stryker Corporation)
 Wargaming Seattle (subsidiary of Cyprus-based Wargaming, formerly Gas Powered Games headquartered in Redmond)
 SpaceX (Satellite Development Center)

See also

References

Redmond, Washington